Verukal Thedi is a 1987 Indian Malayalam film, directed by Somasekharan. The film stars Madhavi and Vishnuvardhan in the lead roles. The film has musical score by Sathyam.

Cast
Madhavi
Vishnuvardhan

Soundtrack
The music was composed by Sathyam and the lyrics were written by Poovachal Khader.

References

External links
 

1987 films
1980s Malayalam-language films
Films directed by V. Somashekhar